Nav-e Bala (also Romanized as Nāv-e Bālā) is a village in Kharajgil Rural District, Asalem District, Talesh County, Gilan Province, Iran. At the 2006 census, its population was 54, in 9 families.

References 

Populated places in Talesh County